Daniella Sarahyba Fernandes (born 8 July 1984) is a Brazilian model. She appeared in every edition of the Sports Illustrated Swimsuit Issue from 2005 to 2010.

Early life
Sarahyba was born in Rio de Janeiro, Brazil; and her mother, Mara Lúcia Sarahyba, was also a model in Brazil. When she was three days old, she appeared with her mother on the cover of Brazilian parenting magazine Pais & Filhos. Sarahyba began entering modeling contests at age 12. From her mother's side, Sarahyba is also of Lebanese ancestry.

Career
She worked for the Victoria's Secret brand and posed for the swimsuit edition of the North American magazine Sports Illustrated Swimsuit Issue in 2005, 2006, 2007, 2008, 2009 and 2010. 

In addition to her Sports Illustrated shoots, she was the subject of several Joanne Gair body painting projects in these editions.

Sarahyba has worked for GAP, Versace, Olympus, Peugeot, Calzedonia, Maidenform and Michael Stars and is contracted under H&M, Spiegel and Benetton.

Personal life
She married businessman Wolff Klabin (of Klabin paper industries) in 2007. They have two daughters.

References

External links

  Daniella Sarahyba official site
  
  Daniella Sarahyba at SI.com

1984 births
Living people
Brazilian people of Lebanese descent
Brazilian people of Spanish descent
People from Rio de Janeiro (city)
Brazilian female models
Lafer-Klabin family